IFIUS (International Federation for Interuniversity Sport) was a democratic non profit organisation whose main objective was to organise the yearly World Interuniversity Games, in which teams of students from different Universities and Colleges worldwide competed in different sport competitions. In 2011, IFIUS was disbanded and integrated inside Panathlon.

History 
Until 2003 the Games were held on Weekends during the year - from 2004 onward the Games were held in a one-week period in October, establishing a true World Championship Format.

Competitions 

Official competitions included:
 Football Men
 Football Women
 Futsal Men
 Basketball Men
 Basketball Women
 Volleyball Men
 Volleyball Women
 Golf and Pitch & putt
 Individual golf
 Individual pitch and putt

Objectives 

The main IFIUS objectives were:
(1) Offer each student in the world the opportunity to compete on an international interuniversity sports level.
(2) Protect the rights of interuniversity sports playing students and universities.
(3) Promote international interuniversity sports in every way it deems fit.

IFIUS Games

Games Council 

 President:  Dr. Bahram Ghadimi (Islamic Azad University)
 Secretary General:  Dr Gabriel Anicet Kotchofa (Gubkin Russian State University of Oil and Gas)
 Treasurer:  Javier Sanchez Milan (CEU Cardinal Herrera University)

Committee Panathlon Clubs of Universities Executive Board 

 President: Peter Verboven (PCU Antwerp, Belgium)
 Secretary General: His Excellency, Ambassador Gabriel A. Kotchofa (PCU Mghakis Moscow, Russia)
 Treasurer: Javier Sanchez (PCU Valencia, Spain)
 Games Council Representative: Dr. Bahram Ghadimi (PCU Teheran, I.R. Iran)
 Tournament Council Representative: Daniel Muñoz (PCU Valencia, Spain)
 Panathlon International Representative: Simona Callo (Secretary General Panathlon International, Italy)

External links 
 Committee Panathlon Clubs of Universities

References

International sports organizations
World Interuniversity Games